The 41st Parliament of British Columbia was in session from June 22, 2017, to September 21, 2020. It consisted of the Legislative Assembly of British Columbia, as elected by the general election of May 9, 2017, and subsequent by-elections, and the Queen in right of British Columbia, represented by the lieutenant governor of British Columbia. It was the first parliament following the increase in size of the legislature from 85 to 87 seats. Immediately following the election, Christy Clark, the incumbent premier, asked the lieutenant governor to remain governing until the final votes were counted and it would be known if there would be a majority or minority government. Lieutenant Governor Judith Guichon agreed and Clark appointed a cabinet of 21 ministers and 13 parliamentary secretaries, which were sworn in on June 12, 2017.

Although the final vote confirmed that the British Columbia Liberal Party under Clark remained the largest party in the legislative assembly after the election, the British Columbia New Democratic Party under leader John Horgan and Green Party of British Columbia under Andrew Weaver combined had 44 seats (41 NDP and 3 Green) to the Liberals' 43. On May 29, 2017, the Greens announced they had agreed to a confidence and supply accord with the NDP which would allow the NDP to form a minority government.

Clark convened the Legislative Assembly on June 22, 2017, before losing a vote of confidence on June 29. As leader of the second-largest party, Horgan was then asked to serve as premier by the lieutenant governor and was sworn in along with his 22-member cabinet on July 18, 2017.

The minority parliament lasted for three and a half years despite the small combined NDP and Green working majority. The longevity of this one-seat working majority was made possible, in part, due to the expulsion of Abbotsford South MLA Darryl Plecas from the Liberal caucus after Plecas accepted his election as speaker of the legislature. The 41st Parliament ended on September 21, 2020, after Horgan requested the lieutenant governor dissolve the legislature and call a snap election for October 24, 2020, almost exactly one year ahead of the planned fixed date of October 16, 2021.

Party standings

Election and appointments
The members of the legislative assembly were elected in the 41st general election, held on May 9, 2017. The election returned 43 BC Liberals, 41 BC NDP members, and 3 BC Greens. As the leader of the largest party, Christy Clark was offered, by Lieutenant Governor Judith Guichon, the first opportunity to form a government, though the BC Green Party had announced they would support the BC NDP. Clark accepted and appointed 21 members to her Executive Council and 13 parliamentary secretaries. The cabinet was largely the same as the 40th Parliament, but with Sam Sullivan and Linda Reid, as well as newcomers Jordan Sturdy, Ellis Ross, and Jas Johal replacing ministers who had retired or were defeated in the election. This cabinet only served during the Parliament's first session in which it lost a confidence vote and Clark resigned as an MLA, triggering a by-election in the Kelowna West riding.

After the government lost a confidence vote, the Lieutenant Governor refused Premier Clark's request to call an election and offered the second largest party, the BC NDP, the opportunity to form a government. BC NDP leader John Horgan agreed and appointed an Executive Council of 22 members and 6 parliamentary secretaries, including Carole James as deputy premier and Minister of Finance, Adrian Dix as Minister of Health, David Eby as Attorney General, Rob Fleming as Minister of Education, and Michelle Mungall as Minister of Energy, Mines and Petroleum Resources.

First session
The first session of the 41st Parliament began on June 22, 2017, with the Speech from the Throne delivered by Lieutenant Governor Guichon on behalf of the Premier Clark and the BC Liberal government. Acknowledging the split results of the election, the speech included not only BC Liberal election promises but also some from the opposition parties, such as banning corporate and union political donations, a maximum donation limit for individuals, a referendum on electoral reform, repealing the referendum requirement for new TransLink revenue sources, eliminating tolls on the Port Mann Bridge, and raising the carbon tax to $50 a tonne. When the throne speech finally came to a vote on June 26, both the NDP and Green parties introduced and voted for a motion of no confidence, defeating the government. In the meantime, the government had attempted to introduce two bills (one that would have reduced the number of MLAs necessary to form an official party within the legislative assembly from 4 to 3, thereby allowing the BC Green Party to gain such status and another addressing corporate and union political donations) but both were refused first reading.

Second session
The second session began on September 8, 2017, and all bills were provided royal assent by November 30. On September 8, BC Liberal Darryl Plecas accepted the position of Speaker of the Legislative Assembly and a speech from the throne was delivered again by Lieutenant Governor Guichon, this time on behalf of Premier Horgan and the BC NDP government with the support of the Green Party. Plecas was expelled from the BC Liberal the following day as a consequence for accepting the Speaker position; Plecas subsequently sat as an Independent and enforced more civility in the legislative assembly.

Legislative amendments related to elections and governance, the Constitution Amendment Act, 2017 (Bill 5) reduced the number of MLAs necessary to form an official party within the legislative assembly from 4 to 2 and changed the fixed election date to October. The Electoral Reform Referendum 2018 Act (Bill 6) requires a referendum respecting a proportional representation voting system be held no later than November 30, 2018. The ban on corporate, union and foreign donations was implemented with the Election Amendment Act, 2017 (Bill 3) and Local Elections Campaign Financing Amendment Act, 2017 (Bill 15) which required all political contributions be made by a resident of British Columbia and sets new maximum donation limits, including limits to third party sponsors, and political spending limits, as well as public subsidies until the year 2022 for the political parties who achieved 5% of the vote in their electoral districts (e.g. the BC NDP, BC Liberal and BC Green parties). The Lobbyists Registration Amendment Act, 2017 (Bill 8) prohibited specified former public office holders (like former members of cabinet, deputy minister, chief executive officers, etc.) from lobbying activities for two years after leaving those positions.

Other bills that were adopted with support from all parties, included the Tenancy Statutes Amendment Act, 2017 (Bill 16) to limit the use of a vacate clause in fixed-term tenancy agreements, limit rent increases imposed at the renewal of fixed-term tenancy agreements to a specified amount (i.e. 2% plus inflation), and increase enforcement abilities against repeat and serious violators of tenancy laws; the Public Safety Statutes Amendment Act, 2017 (Bill 12) to create a system of e-Tickets for driving offences and e-Certificates of service, and validating the practice of impoundment of vehicles as a result of a roadside alcohol test; the Provincial Court Amendment Act, 2017 (Bill 11) to extend the term of judicial appointments from 10 years to 12; the Sheriff Amendment Act, 2017 (Bill 14) to enable sheriffs to collect personal information to a conduct threat or risk assessment; and the Pooled Registered Pension Plans Amendment Act, 2017 (Bill 13) to delete the requirement of print publication of new multilateral agreements.

Third session
The third session began on February 13, 2018, with a new speech from the throne. Ben Stewart joined the legislative assembly as a result of the February 14 by-election in Kelowna West to replace former-Premier Christy Clark. There were no changes to the Executive Council. The Budget Measures Implementation Act, 2018 amended the property transfer tax to cover bare trusts and exempt bankruptcy transactions while increasing the rate paid on the portion of a real estate transaction that is beyond $3million; created an additional school tax applicable to residential properties assessed above $3million; created the means for municipalities to issue "revitalization school tax exemptions" for newly constructed rental housing; made online accommodation platform subject to the Provincial Sales Tax and the hotel tax; eliminated the education tax credit and expanded the film incentive tax credit include to scriptwriting; exempted marine diesel fuel used in inter-jurisdictional cruise ships from the motor fuel tax; increased the PST rate payable on passenger vehicles priced over $125,000; increased the tax on tobacco, and made requirements for additional information regarding residency to claim homeowner grant and property tax deferrals for the purpose of better enforcement. The budget passed on a vote of 44 in favour, 41 opposed. Another budget bill, Bill 44, created – on a 44 to 38 vote – a new payroll tax, on payrolls over $500,000, to replace the Medical Services premium. In a 43 to 42 vote, Bill 51 was adopted to update and modernize the Environmental Assessment Act. In a 43 to 31 vote, the Insurance (Vehicle) Amendment Act, 2018 was passed to limit ICBC accident benefit coverage for minor injuries and to increase the maximum payable limit for other injuries, including adding new coverage for various health care services. Related to the ICBC reforms, Bill 22 expanded the jurisdiction of the Civil Resolution Tribunal to include certain ICBC claim disputes.

Legislative amendments related to housing included Bill 45, which created the Speculation and Vacancy Tax, applicable to unoccupied residential properties in Metro Vancouver, the Capital Regional District, parts of the Fraser Valley Regional District and several other municipalities. Bill 12 addressed "renovictions" by extending the mandatory notice of eviction from 2 to 4 months, legally giving evicted tenants the right of first refusal for the renovated unit, increasing compensation a landlord found guilty of a bad-faith eviction must pay from 2 to 12 months' rent, as well as increasing compensation evicted tenants of manufactured home parks receive from 12 months pad rental to a prescribed sum related to the cost of moving the dwelling. Bill 25 amended the Real Estate Development Marketing Act to address pre-sale condo flipping by requiring developer consent to such activity and making it subject to property transfer tax. Amendments affecting local governments were contained in Bill 18, which requires local governments to collect and report information on housing, such as the available housing stock, and Bill 23, which gives local governments the ability to require, under a zoning regulation, that rental be the only form of occupancy permitted in specified units of multifamily residential developments.

In preparation of the impending legalization of recreational cannabis by the federal government, the Cannabis Control and Licensing Act, the Cannabis Distribution Act, and the  Motor Vehicle Amendment Act, 2018, created a legal framework, including a minimum age of 19 for possession, the province acting as the sole wholesale distributor, sales being accommodated in either public or private retail stores, prohibition of smoking in all the same areas where tobacco smoking is prohibited as well as within vehicles, provisions to deal with drug-affected driving, and the establishment of a new provincial cannabis safety unit. Other legislation related to health included the creation of the Voluntary Blood Donations Act (Bill 29) to prohibit payment for blood donations, subject to certain exemptions; related to the opioid epidemic, the Pill Press and Related Equipment Control Act (Bill 27) to limit who can lawfully own a pill press and to allow for a registry of equipment to be maintained by the government; the Opioid Damages and Health Care Costs Recovery Act (Bill 38) to allow the provincial government to launch an aggregate action lawsuit against opioid manufacturers and wholesalers who misled the public concerning the addictive and harmful nature of opioids; and the Workers Compensation Act was amended to add a new mental disorder presumption for first responders and, at the request of the federal government, extended cancer presumptions to federally employed firefighters.

Without division, Bill 47 repealed the 37th Parliament's Health and Social Services Delivery Improvement Act and the Health Sector Partnerships Agreement Act which enabled contract-flipping in the healthcare sector, Bill 50 re-established the Human Rights Commission for British Columbia which had been abolished by the same Parliament, and Bill 41 repealed the 37th Parliament's Public Education Flexibility and Choice Act which had removed the BC Teachers' Federation ability to negotiate class size and composition, and had led to teacher strikes, but was mostly struck down by the Supreme Court of Canada. Bill 55 created provisions to allow all types of vehicle for hire companies to operate in British Columbia. The Public Interest Disclosure Act (Bill 28) was adopted to protect whistleblowers as recommended in the  Ombudsperson's Misfire report concerning the inappropriate employment terminations within the Ministry of Health – Bill 13 was also implemented a recommendation of the same report, in this case to allow for the Merit Commissioner to review the process used in any dismissal within the public service. Bill 26 amended the Child, Family and Community Service Act to provide indigenous communities with the opportunity for greater involvement in child welfare decisions and to create a right, that must be considered in decision-making, for an indigenous child to learn about the practice of the child's indigenous traditions, customs and language. Bill 34 renamed the Greenhouse Gas Reduction Targets Act to the Climate Change Accountability Act and replaced the 2020 emission reduction target of 33 percent with a 2030 reduction target of 40 percent below 2007 levels.

Other significant legislative amendments, adopted with all party support, included the Employment Standards Amendment Act, 2018, which created a job-protected leave of absence that parents of a child who has gone missing can take (52 weeks unpaid leave) and extended the leave of absence parents of a child who has died can take from 3 days to 104 weeks, as well as amendments in response to expansions of compassionate care, maternity and parental benefits by the federal government. The Temporary Foreign Worker Protection Act (Bill 48) created a licensing program for recruiters and employers of foreign worker and allows for the recovery of unauthorized fees charged by recruiters. Bill 11 modernized the province's International Commercial Arbitration Act by bringing it in line with guidelines of the UN Commission on International Trade Law and Bill 21 brought the province's legislation concerning opting in or out of class action lawsuits into line with the Uniform Law Conference of Canada's guidelines. Bill 15 allows the Oil and Gas Commission to make regulations requiring restoration of inactive wells before the responsible organization claims bankruptcy and to cancel or suspend permits on the basis of applicant's history of non-compliance with restoration; Bill 16 enabled self-regulatory organizations to enforce their decisions with a court order; Bill 4 renamed the BC Innovation Council to "Innovate BC" and expanded its mandate.

Fourth session
The fourth session began on February 12, 2019, with a new speech from the throne. There were no changes to the Executive Council. Sheila Malcolmson joined the legislative assembly as a result of the January 30 by-election in the Nanaimo electoral district to replace Leonard Krog, who resigned to run for Mayor of Nanaimo. BC Liberal Ben Stewart sat as an independent for the two month he was being investigated for an irregular political contribution. Legislative changes resulting from the 2019 budget were implemented in the Budget Measures Implementation Act, 2019, including replacing the "BC early childhood tax benefit" with the "BC child opportunity benefit", making the "BC flow-through mining expenditure tax credit" and the "mining exploration tax credit" permanent, extending or increasing tax credits relating to farmers' food donations, shipbuilding, and small business venture capital, and allowing TransLink to increase the Metro Vancouver fuel tax by 1.5 cents per litre to fund the Phase 2 portion of its 10-Year Investment Plan. The budget passed on a vote of 44 in favour, 39 opposed. In a separate bill, Bill 45, the provincial sales tax payable on vaping products was increased from 7% to 20%. On a 76 to 3 division, with only the Green Party members opposed, Bill 10 repealed the previous parliament's Liquefied Natural Gas Income Tax Act, with its "LNG tax credit" being moved into the Income Tax Act. Three private member's bills, all introduced by Andrew Weaver of the Green Party, were adopted: Bill M-209 allows benefit corporations to be registered in the province, Bill M-206 allows a tenant to terminate a lease if experiencing household violence on the premises, and Bill M-225 makes the fourth Saturday in November Ukrainian Famine and Genocide (Holodomor) Memorial Day. With no division, Bill 20 repealed the Medical Services Plan premium as a head tax (which had been replaced by the payroll tax created in the previous session).

Legislative amendments related to money laundering included Bill 23, which created the Land Owner Transparency Act to require a land-owning corporation, trust or partnership to report beneficial ownership. Relatedly, Bill 24 created the Transparency Register to provide records of registered owners and beneficial owners of corporations to police, regulators and tax authorities. Bill 33 expanded the British Columbia Securities Commission's investigative powers, its ability to collect fines, and its ability to protect whistleblower from retaliatory actions Bills 26 and 37 dissolved the Financial Institutions Commission and created the BC Financial Services Authority, a new crown agency to jointly regulate financial institutions, insurance agencies, and mortgage brokers. Addressing threats from organized crime, the Witness Security Act (Bill 4) was adopted to establish a confidential, voluntary witness security program to supplement the federal version and Bill 13 amended the Community Safety Act to allow a dedicated enforcement unit to accept and investigate confidential complaints about properties that are a threat to the safety of the community.

New legislation, adopted with all-party support, included the Declaration on the Rights of Indigenous Peoples Act (Bill 41) to implement the UNDRIP, the Protection of Public Participation Act (Bill 2) to address strategic lawsuits against public participation; the Ticket Sales Act (Bill 27) to ban the use of automated ticket-purchasing software, mandate secondary ticket sellers disclose the additional fees added to the original price, and provide refunds for cancelled events or unusable (e.g. counterfeit) tickets; the Zero-Emission Vehicles Act (Bill 28), to create a framework with targets for increasing the proportion of new zero-emission light-duty motor vehicles that are sold or leased in BC; and the Fuel Price Transparency Act (Bill 42), to require businesses involved in the transporting, marketing and supplying of gasoline and diesel to provide data to the BC Utilities Commission on how fuel prices are set.

Other significant legislative amendments included Bill 7, which amended the Business Practices and Consumer Protection Act to separately regulate "High-Cost Credit Products" and lower their maximum fees; Bill 4, which amended the Interpretation Act to allow for the ending of daylight saving time; and Bill 14, which created a duty to report discoveries of sites or objects with potential heritage value. Addressing employment and labour standards, Bill 8 raised the minimum work age from 12 to 14, prohibited employers from withholding or deducting tips from wages, and created a new allowance of unpaid leave for victims of domestic violence or critical illness, while Bill 30 removed teachers from the list of essential services and further addressed contract-flipping by extending protections to re-tendered service (janitorial, security, transportation, health) contracts. Both on a 44 to 38 vote, Bill 15 amended the administrative procedures of the Agricultural Land Commission and Bill 22 amended the Forest Act to require ministerial approval for companies to transfer a timber licence and to require public interest be considered in the disposition of forestry agreements. Based on the government's comprehensive review of BC Hydro, Bill 19 amended several acts to, among other things, reinstate the BC Utilities Commission's authority to review BC Hydro's electricity supply and demand forecasting (Integrated Resource Plan), disapply the Utilities Commission Act from Powerex, and require BC Utilities Commission approval of new purchase agreements with independent power producers and feed-in tariffs. Based on the coastal ferry services review, Bill 25 amended the Coastal Ferry Act to add that the BC Ferry Authority must consider the public's interest in safe, reliable and affordable service in addition to the other factors.

Fifth session
The fifth session began on February 11, 2020, with a new speech from the throne. The legislature convened until March 5 before entering a recess which was interrupted by the impact of the COVID-19 pandemic in the province. It reconvened for one day, March 23, with 10 MLAs in attendance, when they adopted a $5-billion aid package and amendments to the Employment Standards Act to create an unpaid "COVID-19-related leave". The legislature re-convened in July and August. Additional COVID-19-related legislation included Bills 18 and 19 which postponed penalties for non-payment of several taxes, created a $1,000 supplement to the Canada Emergency Response Benefit, and allowed provincial budget deficits for the next 3 years. Legislative amendments arising from the 2020 budget (Bill 4) included the creation of a new top tax bracket that starts at $220,000, exempting electric aircraft from PST, three year extensions of the farmers' food donation tax credit and BC training tax credit, removing the PST exemptions that had applied to soda beverages and online streaming services, and making heated tobacco products subject to the Tobacco Tax Act.

Other legislation adopted included Bill 2 to, among other things, allow ICBC to require training courses as a pre-licensing requirement for certain classes of licenses; Bill 5 to amend the fourth session's creation of a 10-day unpaid leave regarding domestic violence to instead be 5 paid and 5 unpaid days for workers claiming to be experiencing domestic or sexual violence; Bill 8 to allow school boards to operate a before and after-school child care programs; Bill 9 as the government's response to Crowder v. British Columbia (Attorney General) regarding the role of expert witnesses in a vehicle injury lawsuits; and Bill 11 moving ICBC to moves a system of no-fault insurance. The fifth session ended on September 21, 2020, after Premier Horgan called a snap election for October 24, therefore dissolving the 41st Parliament. The Parliament was ended nearly one year ahead of the fixed date of October 16, 2021.

Officeholders

Speaker
 Speaker of the Legislative Assembly of British Columbia: 
 Steve Thomson, Liberal (June 22–29, 2017)
 Vacant (June 29 – September 8, 2017)
 Darryl Plecas, Independent (September 8, 2017 – September 21, 2020)

Other chair occupants
 Deputy speaker: Raj Chouhan, NDP
 Assistant deputy speaker: Linda Reid, Liberal (2017 – February 12, 2019)
 Assistant deputy speaker Joan Isaacs, Liberal (2019 – February 11, 2020)
 Assistant deputy speaker Simon Gibson, Liberal
 Deputy chair, Committee of the Whole: Spencer Chandra Herbert, NDP

Leaders
 Premier of British Columbia: 
 Christy Clark, Liberal  (June 22, 2017 – July 18, 2017)
 John Horgan, NDP (July 18, 2017 – September 21, 2020)
 Leader of the Opposition: 
 John Horgan, NDP (June 22, 2017 – July 18, 2017)
 Christy Clark, Liberal  (July 18 – August 4, 2017)
 Rich Coleman, Liberal (August 4, 2017 – February 3, 2018)
 Andrew Wilkinson, Liberal (February 3, 2018 – September 21, 2020)
 Green Party leader: 
 Andrew Weaver (June 22, 2017 – January 6, 2020)
 Adam Olsen (January 6, 2020 – September 14, 2020)
 Sonia Furstenau (September 14, 2020 – September 21, 2020)

House leaders
 Government House Leader: 
Mike de Jong, Liberal  (June 22 – July 18, 2017)
Mike Farnworth, NDP (July 18, 2017 – September 21, 2020)
 Opposition House Leader: 
Mike Farnworth, NDP (June 22 – July 18, 2017)
Mike de Jong, Liberal (July 18, 2017 – February 10, 2018)
Mary Polak, Liberal (February 10, 2018 – September 21, 2020)

Members of the 41st Parliament
 The name in bold and italics, with "", is the premier
The names in bold, with "", are cabinet ministers
The name in italics, with "" is the leader of the Official Opposition

Party standings of the 40th Parliament

Seating plan during Liberal Party government

Seating plan during New Democratic Party government

Standings changes

References

Parliament, 41
Terms of British Columbia Parliaments
Parliament, 41
Parliament, 41
Parliament, 41
Parliament, 41
Parliament, 41
Parliament, 41
British Columbia Parliament, 41
British Columbia Parliament, 41
British Columbia Parliament, 41
British Columbia Parliament, 41